Trakai Kenesa is the kenesa (synagogue) of the Qaraite Jewish community in Trakai, Lithuania, and a rare example of one of the surviving kenesas of the former Polish–Lithuanian Commonwealth. It was built in the 18th century, restored in the 1890s and is still in use.

References

Buildings and structures in Trakai
Synagogues in Lithuania
Karaite synagogues
Wooden synagogues
Wooden buildings and structures in Lithuania